Keskin is a Turkish surname. Notable people with the surname include:
 Aysu Keskin, Turkish female basketball player
 Elif Keskin (born 2002), Turkish women's footballer
 Eren Keskin, Turkish human rights activist
 Gökhan Keskin, retired Turkish professional footballer
 Hakkı Keskin, Turkish-German politician
 Lucia Keskin (Chi With A C, born 2001), English YouTuber
 Selçuk Keskin, Turkish volleyball player

Turkish-language surnames